Saunders SC is a Sri Lankan professional football club based in the Pettah district of Colombo. It is currently playing in the Sri Lanka Champions League.

Achievements
Sri Lankan Premier League: 12
Winner: 1985, 1986, 1987, 1989, 1991, 1992, 1996, 1997, 1998–99, 2000–01, 2001–02, 2004–05.
Sri Lanka FA Cup: 16
Winner: 1949, 1952, 1954, 1955, 1960, 1963, 1964, 1982, 1983–84, 1984–85, 1987–88, 1991–92, 1992–93, 1996–97, 1998–99, 2000–01.

Performance in AFC competitions
Asian Club Championship: 7 appearances
1985: First Round
1986–87: Second Round
1988–89: First Round
1995–96: First Round
1997–98: First Round
1998–99: Second Round
2001–02: Second Round / Withdrew

AFC Champions League
2002–03: Qualifying Round

References

External links
 List of Sri Lanka League Champions at RSSSF.com
 List of Sri Lanka FA Cup winners at RSSSF.com

Football clubs in Sri Lanka